Bakht Zamina  was a famous Pashto singer who performed in major Pashto music events in Kabul.

Life and death
Bakht Zamina was from Konar. She moved to Kabul to carry on her music career.
Zamina was famous for both folk and pop Pashto songs. She was a sympathizer with the People's Democratic Party of Afghanistan, singing some songs in support for them. She has long been forgotten by media mainly due to political reasons, over the decades following her death. Bakht Zamina is believed to have died in 1980, due to tuberculosis. However, Some speculate that she was murdered by Islamic Unity of Afghanistan Mujahideen after she sang her famous song "Khaija Pa Morchal Bande". The true nature of her death has not been confirmed, as it had been shrouded with rumors.

Work
Some of her songs were:
Ma La Ta Juda Kawena
Yara Ghamjan ba Shay
Zama Khoga Janana
Bey Dildara Mey
Zama da Meene Yaara
Raasha Raasha
Khalqi Akhtar dey Mazidar
Pashto Tapey
Khaista Zaan me Jorr Karay de
Sarbaza Yaraa
Khejja pa Morchal Bande

20th-century Afghan women singers
Year of birth missing
Year of death missing